Bundaran HI Station is a rapid transit station on the North-South Line of the Jakarta MRT in Central Jakarta, Jakarta, Indonesia. Located nearby the Hotel Indonesia (HI) Roundabout, it is currently the terminus of the North-South Line, as the phase 2 construction of the line is underway.

History 
The station is connected with stairs to the Bundaran HI TransJakarta stop but there is no direct connection that is accessible for people with disabilities.

Station layout

Places of interest 
 Hotel Indonesia
 Grand Indonesia
 BCA Tower
 Selamat Datang Monument
 Wisma Nusantara
 Plaza Indonesia
 Grand Hyatt Jakarta
 The Plaza
 The Keraton
 Indonesia One Tower
 Sinar Mas Land Plaza
 Graha Mandiri
 Deutsche Bank
  Embassy of Belgium
  Embassy of Japan
 Thamrin City
 Pullman Jakarta Indonesia
 Thamrin City Amaris Hotel

In popular culture 
Bundaran HI Station become the inspiration of the 2019 popular pop song by Indonesian musician Glenn Fredly, "Stasiun Bundaran HI".

Incidents 
During the Jakarta protest of the Omnibus Law on Job Creation on 8 October 2020, Bundaran HI Station was one of the targets of destruction as well as the TransJakarta Bundaran HI bus station. Some entrances had broken glass and paintbrush writing.

Gallery

References

External links

  

Central Jakarta
Jakarta MRT stations
Railway stations opened in 2019